The Journal of Cold Regions Engineering is a quarterly peer-reviewed scientific journal published by the American Society of Civil Engineers. It covers civil engineering related to cold regions.

Abstracting and indexing
The journal is abstracted and indexed in Ei Compendex, Science Citation Index Expanded, ProQuest databases, Civil Engineering Database, Inspec, Scopus, and EBSCO databases.

References

External links

Civil engineering journals
American Society of Civil Engineers academic journals
Publications established in 1987
Glaciology journals